Najib Razak formed the second Najib cabinet after being invited by Tuanku Abdul Halim Muadzam Shah to begin a new government following the 5 May 2013 general election in Malaysia. In order to be the Prime Minister, Najib sworn in before the Yang di-Pertuan Agong on 6 May 2013. Prior to the election, Najib led (as Prime Minister) the first Najib cabinet, a coalition government that consisted of members of the component parties of Barisan Nasional.

A new Cabinet was announced by Prime Minister Mohd. Najib Abdul Razak on 15 May 2013. It was the 19th cabinet of Malaysia formed since independence. The ministers and deputy ministers were then sworn in before King Abdul Halim on the following day. Notably, the two main ethnic Chinese-majority parties in Barisan Nasional, the Malaysian Chinese Association (MCA) and Gerakan declined to join the cabinet due to their dismal performance in the election.

On 25 June 2014, Prime Minister Najib Razak announced a cabinet reshuffle, which saw the return of the MCA and Gerakan to the cabinet.

This is a list of the members of the second cabinet of the sixth Prime Minister of Malaysia, Najib Razak.

Composition
Official sources: Ministers of the Federal Government (No. 2) Order 2013 [P.U. (A) 184/2013], Ministers of the Federal Government (No. 2) (Amendment) Order 2003 [P.U. (A) 324/2013] ,Ministers of the Federal Government (No. 2) (Amendment) (No. 2) Order 2015 [P.U. (A) 154/2014], Ministers of the Federal Government (No. 2) (Amendment) (No. 2) Order 2014 [P.U. (A) 201/2014], Ministers of the Federal Government (No. 2) (Amendment) Order 2015 [P.U. (A) 60/2015],
Ministers of the Federal Government (No. 2) (Amendment) (No. 2) Order 2015 [P.U. (A) 224/2015]

Full members
The federal cabinet consisted of the following ministers:

Deputy ministers

See also
 Members of the Dewan Rakyat, 13th Malaysian Parliament
 Shadow Cabinet of Malaysia

Notes

References

Cabinet of Malaysia
2013 establishments in Malaysia
Cabinets established in 2013